Bolton Wanderers F.C. is an English professional association football club based in Horwich, Bolton. The club was founded as Christ Church F.C. in 1874, making them one of the oldest football clubs in England, and turned professional in 1877, before joining the Football League as founder members in 1888. Bolton Wanderers currently play in Premier league, the third tier of English football. They were relegated from the top tier (where they had been since 2001) in 2012 but in their time as a professional club have played in all four professional English leagues.

This list encompasses the major honours won by Bolton Wanderers and records set by the club, their managers and their players. The player records section includes details of the club's leading goalscorers and those who have made most appearances in first-team competitions. It also records notable achievements by Bolton Wanderers players on the international stage, and the highest transfer fees paid and received by the club. The club's attendance records, both at The Reebok Stadium, their home since 1997, and Burnden Park, their home between 1895 and 1997, are also included in the list.

The club have won the FA Cup four times, but not since 1958, and have spent the majority of their history in the top flight of English football. Bolton also hold the record for the most years in the top flight of English football without winning the title; 73 years in total. The club's record appearance maker is Eddie Hopkinson, who made 578 appearances between his debut in 1952 and retirement in 1970, and the club's record goalscorer is Nat Lofthouse, who scored 285 goals in 503 games between 1946 and 1960.

All stats accurate as of end of 2018-19 season.

Honours

Domestic

League titles 
 Level II
 Football League First Division
 Winners (1): 1996–97
 Promotion Playoff Winners (2): 1995, 2001.
 Football League Second Division:
 Winners (2): 1908–09, 1977–78
 Runners Up (4): 1899–1900, 1904–05, 1910–11, 1934–35.
 Level III
 Football League Third Division/EFL League One
 Winners (1): 1972–73
 Runners Up (2): 1992–93, 2016–17.
 Level IV
 Football League Fourth Division/EFL League Two
 3rd Place Promotion (2): 1987–88, 2020–21.

Cups 
 FA Cup:
 Winners (4): 1923, 1926, 1929, 1958
 Runners Up (3): 1894, 1904, 1953
 League Cup:
 Runners Up (2): 1995, 2004
 FA Charity Shield
 Winners (1): 1958

Other/Reserve
 Lancashire Cup
 Winners (12): 1886, 1891, 1912, 1922, 1925, 1927, 1932, 1934, 1939 (joint winners with Preston North End), 1948, 1988, 1990
 Central League
 Winners (2): 1955, 1995
 Football League Trophy:
 Winners (1): 1989
 Runners Up (1): 1986
 Football League War Cup (North)
 Winners (1): 1945
 Football League War Cup (Overall)
 Winners (1): 1945

Players 

All current players are in bold

Appearances 
 Youngest first-team player: Ray Parry 15 years 267 days (v. Wolves, 13 October 1951).
 Oldest first-team player: Peter Shilton 45 years 239 days (v. Wolves, 15 May 1995).
 Most consecutive League appearances: 161 – Jim McDonagh, 2 October 1976 – 3 May 1980

Most appearances
Competitive matches only.

 Goalscorers 
 Most league goals in a season: Joe Smith, 38 goals in 1920–21 season.
 Most goals scored in a match: 5
 Billy Struthers v Bootle, 4 November 1882
 James Cassidy v Sheffield United 1 February 1890
 Tony Caldwell v Walsall 10 September 1983

 Top goalscorers Competitive matches only.''

International 
 Most capped player: Ricardo Gardner, 72 caps for Jamaica as a Bolton Wanderers player. 37 of his (then) 109 caps coming in 1997 and 1998 prior to signing with Bolton. He made three more after leaving in 2012.
 First player to play in a World Cup: Nat Lofthouse for England against Belgium on 17 June 1954.
 First player to score in a World Cup: Nat Lofthouse against Belgium on 17 June 1954.
 Most World Cup goals: Nat Lofthouse, 3 (1958).

World Cup participants 
This section lists all players who have played in a World Cup Finals game whilst playing for Bolton Wanderers F.C.

European Championship participants 
This section lists all players who have played in a European Championship Finals game whilst playing for Bolton Wanderers F.C.

Record transfer fees

Paid 
Bolton Wanderers's record signing is Johan Elmander, who signed for the club from Toulouse for £8.2 million in June 2008. This beat the previous record of £8.0 million, which the club paid Fenerbahce for Nicolas Anelka in 2006

Progression of record fee paid
The club's first £1,000 transfer came in 1911, when they signed Alf Bentley from Derby County. They made their first £100,000 signing in 1978 with the transfer of Alan Gowling from Newcastle United for £120,000 and their first £1,000,000 transfer when they signed Gerry Taggart from Barnsley in 1995.

Received 
The largest fee that Bolton Wanderers have received for one of their players was the £15million that Chelsea paid for the services of Nicolas Anelka during the transfer window of January 2008. Four years later, Bolton received their second largest transfer fee, also from Chelsea, for defender Gary Cahill.

Club records

League Highs and Lows 
 Most points in a season: 98 in 46 matches, First Division, 1996–97.
 Most home wins in a season: 18, 1924–25, 1972–73, 1992–93, 1996–97.
 Most home draws in a season: 11, 1979–80.
 Most home losses in a season: 15, 2018–19.
 Most home goals scored in a season: 63, 1934–35.
 Most home goals conceded in a season: 39, 2011–12.
 Most away wins in a season: 14, 2000–01 (15 including playoff final).
 Most away draws in a season: 10, 1986–87, 1996–97, 1996–97.
 Most away losses in a season: 19, 2015–16.
 Most away goals scored in a season: 40, 1996–97 (41 2000–01 including playoffs).
 Most away goals conceded in a season: 59, 1932–33.
 Most wins in a season: 28, 1996–97.
 Most draws in a season: 17, 1991–92.
 Most losses in a season: 30, 2018–19.
 Most goals scored in a season: 100 in 46 matches, First Division, 1996–97, including 2 own goals.
 Most goals conceded in a season: 92, 1932–33.
 Fewest home wins in a season: 4, 2011–12, 2018–19, 2019–20 (If including Cup matches, then only 2018–19 and 2019–20 with 5 wins each, 2011–12 has 7)
 Fewest home draws in a season: 0, 1988–89, 1890–91, 1904–05.
 Fewest home losses in a season: 0, 1910–11, 1920–21.
 Fewest home goals scored in a season: 18, 1893–94, 1897–98, 1902–03, 2018–19
 Fewest home goals conceded in a season: 7, 1899–90.
 Fewest away wins in a season: 0, 1949–50, 1979–80, 2015–16.
 Fewest away draws in a season: 0, 1889–90, 1891–92.
 Fewest away losses in a season: 3, 1899–90, 1904–05, 1996–97.
 Fewest away goals scored in a season: 10, 1897–98.
 Fewest away goals conceded in a season: 16, 1904–05.
 Fewest wins in a season: 5, 1979–80.
 Fewest draws in a season: 1, 1889–90, 1890–91.
 Fewest losses in a season: 4, 1899–90, 1996–97.
 Fewest goals scored in a season: 27, 1897–98.
 Fewest goals conceded in a season: 25, 1899–90.

Matches

Record wins 
 Record League home win: 8–0 (v. Barnsley, 6 October 1934).
 Record League away win: 7–1 (v. Aston Villa, 26 December 1914).
 Record FA Cup home win: 13–0 (v. Sheffield United second round, 1 February 1890).
 Record FA Cup away win: 5–1 (v. Charlton Athletic third round, 14 January 1933).
 Record League Cup home win: 6–1 (v. Tottenham Hotspur fourth round, 27 November 1996).
 Record League Cup away win: 4–0 (v. Rochdale second round, 10 October 1973).
 Record Premier League home win: 5–0 (v. Stoke City, 6 November 2011.
 Record Premier League away win: 5–0 (v. Leicester City, 18 August 2001).

Record defeats 
 Record League home defeat:
 0–10 (v. Arsenal, Division One, 1 January 1937).
 Record League away defeat:
 0–7 (v. Burnley, Division One, 1 March 1890).
 0–7 (v. Sheffield Wednesday, Division One, 1 March 1915).
 0–7 (v. Manchester City, Division One, 21 March 1936).
 Record FA Cup home defeat:
 0–5 (v. Bristol City, Round One, 7 February 1903).
 0–5 (v. Manchester City, Round Five, 20 February 1937).
 Record FA Cup away defeat: 1–9 (v. Preston North End, Round Two, 10 December 1887).
 Record League Cup home defeat: 0–6 (v. Chelsea, Round Four replay, 8 November 1971).
 Record League Cup away defeat: 0–6 (v. Tottenham Hotspur, Round Five, 11 December 2001).
 Record Premier League home defeat: 0–6 (v. Manchester United, 25 February 1996).
 Record Premier League away defeat: 2–6 (v. Manchester City, 18 October 2003).
 Record loss at Wembley: 0–5 (v. Stoke City, 17 April 2011).

Record draws 
 Highest scoring League draw:
 4–4 (v. Blackburn Rovers, Division One, 8 December 1888).
 4–4 (v. Stoke City, Division One, 15 October 1892).
 4–4 (v. Middlesbrough, Division One, 9 December 1905).
 4–4 (v. West Ham United, Division One, 26 March 1927).
 4–4 (v. Portsmouth, Division One, 23 February 1929).
 4–4 (v. West Bromwich Albion, Division One, 18 March 1980).
 4–4 (v. Bradford City, Division Three, 17 September 1991).
 Highest scoring FA Cup draw: 5–5 (v. Eagley, Round One, 22 October 1881).
 Highest scoring League Cup draw: 4–4 after extra time (v. Oldham Athletic, Round One, Second Leg, 4 September 1984).
 Highest scoring Premier League draw:
 3–3 (v. Derby County, 14 December 1997).
 3–3 (v. Manchester City, 12 December 2009).

Most Consecutive 
 Wins: 11. (v. Gainsborough Trinity, 10 November 1904) – (v. Barnsley, 20 January 1905).
 Home wins: 13. (v. Gainsborough Trinity, 12 November 1910) – (v. Chelsea, 26 April 1911).
 Away wins: 5. (v. Doncaster Rovers, 14 December 1904) – (v. Burnley, 22 January 1905) and (v. Fleetwood Town, 11 March 2017) – (v. Southend United, 4 April 2017)
 Draws: 6. (v. Manchester City, 25 January 1913) – (v. Derby County, 8 March 1913).
 Losses: 11. (v. Sheffield United, 7 April 1902) – (v. Wolverhampton Wanderers, 18 October 1902).
 Home Losses: 7. (v. Sunderland, 7 May 2011) – (v. Sunderland, 22 October 2011).
 Away Losses: 15. (v. Brentford, 14 April 1984) – (v. Bradford City, 29 December 1984).
 Games without scoring: 8. (v. 	Middlesbrough, 9 April 2019) – (v. Coventry City, 10 August 2019).
 Games with scoring: 24.
 (v. Derby County, 8 September 1888) – (v. Everton, 21 September 1889)
 (v. Sheffield United, 22 November 1996) – (v. Oxford United, 12 April 1997).
 Games without losing: 23. (v. Bury, 13 October 1990) – (v. Fulham, 9 March 1991).
 Home games without losing: 27. (v. Sheffield United, 24 April 1920) – (v. Huddersfield Town, 24 September 1921).
 Away games without losing: 11. (v. Doncaster Rovers, 10 December 1904) – (v. West Bromwich Albion, 22 April 1905).
 Games without a draw: 34. (v. Newcastle United, 26 February 2011) – (v. Wolverhampton Wanderers, 31 December 2011) including 2 FA Cup games and 3 League Cup games.
 Games without a win: 26. (v. Sheffield United, 7 April 1902) – (v. West Bromwich Albion, 10 January 1903).
 Home games without a win: 12. (v. Sheffield Wednesday, 12 March 2019 – Rochdale, 19 October 2019).
 Away games without a win: 28. (v. Everton, 16 April 1979) – (v. Oldham Athletic, 27 September 1980).
 Games without conceding: 7. (v. Woolwich Arsenal, 24 February 1900) – (v. Chesterfield, 14 April 1900).
 Games with conceding: 27. (v. Sheffield United, 7 April 1902) – (v. Notts County, 17 January 1903).

Attendances 
 Highest attendance at a home match (Burnden Park): 69,912 (v. Manchester City, FA Cup Fifth Round, 18 February 1933).
 Highest attendance at a home match (Reebok Stadium): 28,353 (v. Leicester City, Premier League, 28 December 2003).
 Lowest attendance at a home match (Burnden Park): 1,507 (v. Rochdale, Football League Trophy, 10 December 1991).
 Lowest attendance at a home match (Reebok Stadium): 1,540 (v. Everton U21, Football League Trophy First Round, Group Stage, Match One, 30 August 2019). (not counting behind closed doors games)
 Highest attendance at a FA Cup match (Wembley Stadium (1923)): 126,047 (official) (v. West Ham, FA Cup Final, 28 April 1923). Some estimates of attendance exceed 300,000.
 Highest attendance at a League Cup match (Wembley Stadium (1923)): 75,595 (v. Liverpool, League Cup Final, 2 April 1995).

Bolton Wanderers in Europe 
Below is Bolton Wanderers' record in Europe. As of 2008 they have appeared in the UEFA Cup twice, losing only two games in the process.

Notes 

Records And Statistics
Bolton Wanderers